The coats of arms of the Portuguese Empire's colonies were all of a uniform style following 1935. Two of them had, however, been using provisional coats of arms of the same style shortly prior to this.

Gallery
This gallery include the lesser coats of arms. The years given are for the coats of arms.

See also
Coat of arms of Portugal
Portuguese heraldry

References

Former Portuguese colonies
Portuguese coats of arms
Portugal